Jaime Fields (August 28, 1970 – August 29, 1999) was an American football player, a linebacker with the Kansas City Chiefs of the National Football League (NFL) for three seasons. He played college football at the University of Washington in Seattle and was selected in the fourth round of the 1993 NFL Draft.

After his playing career, Fields was killed  at age 29 in a hit-and-run automobile accident in southern

Early years
Born and raised in southern California, Fields attended Lynwood High School in Lynwood.

College career
Fields played for the Washington Huskies from 1988 to 1992 for head coach Don James.  He was known on the field for his speed and hitting ferocity. With Fields at linebacker, the Huskies went to three consecutive Rose Bowls as Pacific-10 Conference champions and shared a national championship (1991) after the second.

References

External links
Just Sports Stats
 

1970 births
1999 deaths
American football linebackers
Washington Huskies football players
Kansas City Chiefs players
Scottish Claymores players
Players of American football from Compton, California
Road incident deaths in California
Pedestrian road incident deaths